FEC may refer to:

Commerce 
 Foreign exchange certificate
 Forward exchange contract; see Forward exchange market

Education 
 Far Eastern College, in Manila, Philippines
 Further education college, in the United Kingdom

Government and politics 
 Far Eastern Commission, in post-war Japan
 Federal Election Commission, in the United States
 Ferrol en Común, a Galician political coalition

Science, technology and medicine
 Farnell (company), a British electronic component distributor
 Fecal egg count
 Forward error correction
 Forwarding equivalence class
 Fluorouracil-epirubicin-cyclophosphamide; see Chemotherapy regimen

Transport 
 Feira de Santana Airport, in Brazil
 Florida East Coast Railway, an American railroad

Other uses
 Ecuadorian Cycling Federation
 Family entertainment center
 Family Equality Council, an American civil rights advocacy group
 FEC, a nickname of Michael Atherton (born 1968), English cricketer
 Far East Council
 Fec Publishing, a German publisher
 Federation of Egalitarian Communities in the United States
 Federation of Employees and Managers, French trade union
 Fellow of Engineers Canada
 Fellowship of Evangelical Churches, an American church group
 Food Editors' Club Germany
 Frank Erwin Center, on the campus of the University of Texas
 Tom Fec, American electronic musician